Helix figulina is a species of air-breathing land snail, a terrestrial pulmonate gastropod mollusk in the family Helicidae, the typical snails.

Description 
The shells of this species are dirty white to yellow-brownish in color, usually 21-27×20-26 mm in size. Large shells are about 29-31×29-30 mm.

Distribution 
This species is present in Greece, Bulgaria and North Macedonia, except, perhaps, the island of Skyros in the Aegean Sea, where only empty shells of the species have been found, suggesting a recent extinction in the area. There have been reports of the species in western Turkey, however, it seems that these are actually Helix nucula, a related and similar species.

Habitat 
This land snail is found in a variety of habitats including dry, open, shrub-land areas. It ranges from coastal areas (dunes) up to 700 m above sea level. On the continent, it lives only in areas where there is enough soil, as it is a soil-dwelling species, and sometimes buries deep into the soil. In southwest Bulgaria it lives at altitudes of up to 700 m.

References

External links 

 Encyclopedia of Life — Helix figulina
 GBIF — Helix figulina

Gastropods described in 1839
Helix (gastropod)